Grant Taylor may refer to:

 Grant Taylor (actor) (1917–1971), English-born actor
 Grant Taylor (skateboarder) (born 1991), American skateboarder
 Grant Taylor (sport shooter) (born 1950), New Zealand sports shooter
 Grant Austin Taylor (born 1995), American rock and blues guitarist